Linda Jeffrey (born ) is a politician in Ontario, Canada. From 2003 to 2014 she was a Liberal member of the Legislative Assembly of Ontario who represented the ridings of Brampton Centre and then Brampton—Springdale. She served as a cabinet minister in the governments of Dalton McGuinty and Kathleen Wynne. On March 25, 2014, she resigned from the legislature to run for Mayor of Brampton, and was elected on October 27, 2014. On 22 October 2018, Jeffrey was narrowly defeated in the mayoral race by former Ontario Progressive Conservative leader Patrick Brown.

Background
Jeffrey was born in Cork, Ireland, and moved to Brampton in 1983. She and her husband, John Jeffrey, have three sons.

Political career

City Councillor
Jeffrey was elected as a city councillor for Brampton's Ward 2 in 1991, and helped to negotiate the sale of Brampton Hydro toward the end of the decade (in addition to representing Brampton on the provincial Hydro One Board of Directors). Jeffrey also chaired the city's Budget Committee, and increased public access to the city's budget review process during her time as a councillor. She served as Acting Mayor of Brampton in May 2001, making at least one official appearance with the title.

Provincial politics
During the Progressive Conservatives Party of Ontario 2002 leadership contest, Jeffrey was approached to be the returning officer in Brampton as the party wanted someone who would be independent. In order to be a returning officer, she had to be a member of the party so she joined the PC party in 2002.

Jeffrey joined the Ontario Liberal Party in 2003 after being recruited by Greg Sorbara to run in the provincial election of 2003. She defeated incumbent Progressive Conservative Joe Spina by 1,005 votes in Brampton Centre. The Liberals won the election and she initially served as a backbench supporter of Premier Dalton McGuinty. She was re-elected in the redistributed riding of Brampton-Springdale in 2007 and 2011.

Between 2005 and 2010 she served in a variety of positions including Parliamentary Assistant to the Ministers of Children and Youth Services, Democratic Renewal, Intergovernmental Affairs, Citizenship and Immigration and Transportation.

On January 18, 2010, Premier Dalton McGuinty appointed her to cabinet as Minister of Natural Resources. On October 10, 2011, she was appointed Minister of Labour and Minister Responsible for Seniors.

During the 2013 Ontario Liberal Party leadership contest, Jeffrey was the first cabinet minister and one of four sitting MPPs (along with Reza Moridi, Mario Sergio, and David Zimmer) that endorsed Kathleen Wynne's candidacy at Wynne's campaign launch. On February 11, 2013, Wynne appointed her Minister of Municipal Affairs and Housing and Chair of Cabinet.

Cabinet positions

Mayor of Brampton
After incumbent Brampton mayor Susan Fennell was embroiled in numerous scandals over expenses and financial record-keeping, former Ontario Premier Bill Davis reportedly convinced Jeffrey to resign from provincial cabinet to challenge Fennell.

On March 25, 2014, Jeffrey resigned from the legislature to run for Mayor of Brampton in the 2014 municipal election. As of September 30, 2014 she was polling well ahead of the incumbent Susan Fennell. She won the mayoral election defeating Susan Fennell with 49.33% of the vote.

After taking office as mayor, Jeffrey appointed former Premier Davis to a panel tasked with bringing a university to Brampton. However, Davis and Jeffrey had a falling out over Peel Region's proposed Light Rail Transit line, as Jeffrey supported its extension from Hurontario Street in Mississauga further north along Main Street in Brampton (where it would run by Davis' house), while Davis preferred an alternative alignment along Queen Street.

Jeffrey's 2018 re-election campaign saw Jeffrey run against former Ontario Progressive Conservative Party leader Patrick Brown and former Conservative federal minister Bal Gosal, among others. Former Premier Davis had switched his support to Brown over the Light Rail Transit issue. Despite that, and her background as a Liberal, Jeffrey held a fundraiser at the Conservative Party-associated venue the Albany Club of Toronto, accepting endorsements from former Ontario Progressive Conservative Party presidents Richard Ciano and Ken Zeise, as well as Michael Diamond, Premier Doug Ford's leadership campaign manager. According to the Toronto Star, Jeffrey had the backing of "PC party operatives — Doug Ford’s campaign manager organized a fundraiser for her".

Jeffery lost her re-election bid to Patrick Brown by a narrow margin in the 2018 Peel Region municipal elections. In a speech to supporters, Jeffrey said that during her tenure as mayor, "we brought in accountability, openness and transparency to city hall. I can confidently say our city is in better shape than what I found it”.

Election results

Mayor of Brampton

Brampton—Springdale

Brampton Centre

References

External links

1958 births
Women government ministers of Canada
Irish emigrants to Canada
Living people
Members of the Executive Council of Ontario
Ontario Liberal Party MPPs
Mayors of Brampton
Politicians from County Cork
Women MPPs in Ontario
Women mayors of places in Ontario
21st-century Canadian politicians
21st-century Canadian women politicians